Stranger Point is a point forming the southernmost tip of King George Island in the South Shetland Islands of Antarctica. It was named by the United Kingdom Antarctic Place-Names Committee (UK-APC) in 1960 for the sealer Stranger (Captained by Joseph Adams) from Boston, which visited the South Shetland Islands in 1820–21 in company with the O'Cain, operating from nearby Potter Cove.

Headlands of King George Island (South Shetland Islands)